Francesco Scuderi (born 10 February 1949) is an Italian wrestler. He competed in the men's Greco-Roman 57 kg at the 1972 Summer Olympics.

References

1949 births
Living people
Italian male sport wrestlers
Olympic wrestlers of Italy
Wrestlers at the 1972 Summer Olympics
Sportspeople from Catania
20th-century Italian people